Hemmadi or Hemmady is a village on the banks of Chakra river. The village is located in Kundapura taluk of Udupi district ( formerly Dakshina Kannada district up to 1997 ).The village is situated on National Highway 66,a road from here goes to Kollur via Vandse. Historical Sri Lakshminarayana temple is located in the heart of the village. Agriculture is the main economic source, people also follow horticulture.

National Highway 66 passes through the city.

External links 
 Hemmadi village population

Villages in Udupi district